The Mary Smith Prize (defunct) was a prestigious art prize awarded to women artists by the Pennsylvania Academy of the Fine Arts. It recognized the best work by a Philadelphia woman artist at PAFA's annual exhibition — one that showed "the most originality of subject, beauty of design and drawing, and finesse of color and skill of execution". The prize was founded in 1879 by Russell Smith in memory of his deceased daughter, artist Mary Russell Smith. It was awarded from 1879 to 1968.

Prize
In the nineteenth century, women artists were rarely awarded major prizes. They were mostly limited to prizes designated for them. But rare exceptions included: Anna Elizabeth Klumpke, who won the 1889 Temple Gold Medal at PAFA; Mary Hazelton, who won the 1896 Hallgarten Prize at the National Academy of Design; and Cecilia Beaux, who won the 1899 Carnegie Prize at the Carnegie Museum of Art and the 1900 Temple Gold Medal at PAFA. 

Initially, the Mary Smith Prize carried a cash prize of $100, which was increased to $300 in 1960. Cecilia Beaux had won this prize four times before she was awarded the Temple Gold Medal. 

Other 19th-century prizes for women artists were the Dodge Prize at the National Academy of Design and the Shaw Prize at the Society of American Artists.

Mary Russell Smith
Mary Russell Smith was the daughter of landscape and theatrical scenery painter William Thompson Russell Smith (Russell Smith) (1812–96) and amateur artist Mary Priscilla Wilson Smith (1819–74). Both of her parents exhibited at the Pennsylvania Academy of the Fine Arts. Mary and her brother, Xanthus Russell Smith, both developed an interest in painting. Xanthus attended the Pennsylvania Academy of the Fine Arts and Mary exhibited her paintings of rabbits, chicks, and other animals there 1859 to 1869, and again between 1876 and 1878. 

Russell Smith established the Mary Smith Prize following her death. Mary Russell Smith had designated that upon her death the proceeds of the sale of her paintings should be used to fund the prize, to be awarded to women artists.

Recipients

See also
 Beck Gold Medal
 Temple Gold Medal
 Widener Gold Medal

Notes

References

Pennsylvania Academy of the Fine Arts
American visual arts awards
Awards established in 1879
Awards disestablished in 1969
1879 establishments in Pennsylvania
1969 disestablishments in Pennsylvania